McNally is an Irish surname. It derives from Gaelic Mac an Fhailí. In County Mayo the family were of Norman origin. Notable people with the surname include:
 Andrew McNally (1836–1904), American co-founder of Rand-McNally
 Art McNally (1926-2022), American sports executive
 Caty McNally (born 2001), American tennis player
 Dave McNally (1942–2002), American baseball player 
 Charles McNally (1787–1864), Irish bishop of Clogher
 Joanne McNally (born 1983), Irish stand-up comedian, writer and actress
 John McNally (born 1951), Scottish politician
 John McNally (1932–2022), Irish olympic boxer
 Keith McNally (born 1951), British restaurateur
 Kevin McNally (born 1956), English actor
 Leonard McNally (1752–1820), Irish barrister, playwright and spy
 Luke McNally (born 1999), Irish footballer
 Mark McNally (born 1971),  Scottish footballer
 Paddy McNally (born 1937), British motorsport businessman
 Randy McNally (born 1944), American politician and 50th lieutenant governor of Tennessee
 Shane McNally (born 1954), Australian rugby player
 Shannon McNally (born 1973), American singer-songwriter
 Stephen McNally (1911–1994), American actor
 Terrence McNally (1938–2020), American playwright
 Tom McNally, Baron McNally (born 1943), British politician
 William McNally (1894–1976), British soldier and Victoria Cross recipient
 Zena McNally (born 1979), English radio presenter and model

See also 
 McAnally
 Cú Chulainn
 Normans in Ireland

References